The African Center for Community Empowerment (ACCE) is a nonprofit, community-based organization serving youth and adults in Southeastern Queens, New York, USA The ACCE was founded in Far Rockaway, Queens in 2000 to help solve the poverty-related problems of inner-city youth and their families, and is currently in operation as an after-school program and community center in St. Albans, Queens.

The organization is the recipient of the 2005 Union Square Awards.

References

External links
Webpage

Organizations based in New York City
Community empowerment